Data#3-Symantec Racing Team p/b Scody is an Australian UCI Continental cycling team established in 2015.

Major wins
2015
Stage 2 New Zealand Cycle Classic, Craig Evers
Stage 1 (ITT) Tour of Borneo, Craig Evers

References

UCI Continental Teams (Oceania)
Cycling teams established in 2015
Cycling teams based in Australia
2015 establishments in Australia